R.I.P., also known as R.I.P. - The Lost Album, is a studio album by English rock band the Zombies. It was originally scheduled to be released in 1969, but was cancelled. It was finally released in Japan in October 2000 by Imperial Records.

In 1968, Rod Argent and Chris White began working on material for a possible new band when they were approached by CBS to do another Zombies album. Side A of the album is composed of new tracks that were cut with a lineup of Argent, Hugh Grundy, Jim Rodford (bass) and Rick Birkett (guitar). Side B is composed of old out-takes and demos that were overdubbed and enhanced in sessions at Morgan Studios in London.

Two songs from the album, "Imagine the Swan" (one of the newly recorded songs) and "If It Don't Work Out" (a demo of a song that Dusty Springfield recorded and released in 1965), were put out as singles in 1969.

"She Loves the Way They Love Her" and "Smokey Day" were recycled by Argent and White for Colin Blunstone's 1971 solo album, One Year.

Track listing

Personnel
The Zombies
 Rod Argent – vocals, keyboards, production
 Chris White – bass, production
 Colin Blunstone – vocals
 Paul Atkinson – guitar
 Hugh Grundy – drums
 Jim Rodford – bass
 Rick Birkett – guitar

References

2000 albums
The Zombies albums
Albums produced by Rod Argent